Circobotys heterogenalis is a moth in the family Crambidae. It was described by Otto Vasilievich Bremer in 1864. It is found in Japan and the Russian Far East.

Subspecies
Circobotys heterogenalis heterogenalis (Russia: Ussuri)
Circobotys heterogenalis onumalis Munroe & Mutuura, 1969 (Japan: Hokkaido)

References

Moths described in 1864
Pyraustinae